Pyrausta venilialis is a moth in the family Crambidae. It was described by Paul Mabille in 1880. It is found on Madagascar.

References

Moths described in 1880
venilialis
Moths of Madagascar